Stephanie Anne Barna is an American military officer, attorney, and civil servant. After Robert Wilkie's appointment as acting United States Secretary of Veterans Affairs by Donald Trump in 2018, Barna took over as acting Under Secretary of Defense for Personnel and Readiness. She currently serves as general counsel to the majority staff of the United States Senate Committee on Armed Services. 

Barna is a Fellow of the National Academy of Public Administration.

References

External links
 Department of Defense biography

Living people
Trump administration personnel
United States Army officers
United States Army reservists
21st-century American lawyers
Year of birth missing (living people)